Perkin's line is a line drawn on an AP radiograph of the pelvis perpendicular to Hilgenreiner's line at the  lateral aspects of the triradiate cartilage of the acetabulum.

Clinical use

Used in conjunction with Hilgenreiner's line, Perkin's line is useful in the diagnosis of developmental dysplasia of the hip; the upper femoral epiphysis should be in the inferomedial quadrant on a normal radiograph. Lateral displacement relative to Perkin's line is indicative of DDH.

References

External links 
Wheeless Online

Musculoskeletal radiographic signs